Masa Yamaguchi (born 1974) is a professional actor who appeared in the movie The Condemned.

Yamaguchi was born in London. He studied acting at Australia's National Institute of Dramatic Art, graduating in 2001. He later appeared in the film The Condemned as Saiga, a Japanese killer, who later teams up with McStarley. He has studied martial arts.  He has also acted on stage, including in Katherine Thomson's King Tide for the Griffin Theatre Company.

Masa has appeared in:
Star Wars: Episode III – Revenge of the Sith (2005) - Senator (uncredited)
Feed (2005) - Dog Boy
The Great Raid (2005) - Lt. Hikobe
Dark Love Story (2006) - Kiyoshi
The Jammed (2007) - Dyce
The Condemned (2007) - Saiga
Onshinfutsu (2008) - Yutaka Honjo
Tomorrow, When the War Began (2010) - Sergeant (uncredited)
10 Terrorists (2012) - Japan
The Wolverine (2013) - Yakuza 4
The Railway Man (2013) - Kempei Officer
Top Knot Detective (2017) - Haruto Kioke / Kurosaki Itto / Sperm
The Brighton Miracle (film) (2019) - JR

References

External links

Living people
1974 births
People educated at Brighton Grammar School
20th-century Australian male actors
21st-century Australian male actors
Australian male film actors
Australian people of Japanese descent
Australian male television actors
English emigrants to Australia
20th-century English male actors
21st-century English male actors
English people of Japanese descent
English male television actors
English male film actors
Male actors of Japanese descent